Gwyneth Lake Provincial Park is a provincial park in British Columbia, Canada, located 70 kilometres west of Lillooet, British Columbia.  The park, which is 132 ha. in size, was established in 2010.

External links
Backgrounder

Provincial parks of British Columbia
2010 establishments in British Columbia
Protected areas established in 2010